Kyle Burkhart (born September 18, 1986) is a former American football tackle. He is from Kinsley, KS.

Professional career
After going undrafted in the 2010 NFL Draft, Burkhart signed a free agent contract with the Seattle Seahawks. After being released from the Seahawks due to injury, Burkhart signed with the New York Jets. After he was again released due to injury, he then signed with the Hartford Colonials of the UFL for the 2010 season. Burkhart signed with the BC Lions of the CFL for 2011 season. Burkhart retired from playing football before the 2012 season.

Post Football career
He took over as the head football coach for his alma mater, Kinsley High School, starting in June 2016.

2010 NFL Draft

References

External links
Southern Miss Golden Eagles Bio
NFL Draft Profile
2009 Phil Steele's All Conference USA Selections
Rivals.com Profile

American football offensive linemen
1986 births
Living people
Players of American football from Kansas
People from Kinsley, Kansas
Dodge City Conquistadors football players
Southern Miss Golden Eagles football players
Pratt Beavers men's basketball players
American men's basketball players